Arquipélago (meaning Archipelago in Portuguese) is a neighbourhood in the city of Porto Alegre, the state capital of Rio Grande do Sul, Brazil. It was created by Law 2022 on December 7, 1959. The neighbourhood comprises 16 islands that are also part of Jacuí Delta State Park.

Neighbourhoods in Porto Alegre
Populated places established in 1959